The Show was a band from Pittsburgh, Pennsylvania. The band is best known for the singles "I Don't Mind" and "To Save My Soul" from their 2009 debut LP Here's to Your Jigsaw, and also for their single "Don't Ask Don't Tell" (2013).

History

Background 
Johnny Saint-Lethal (born William Ainsworth) and Brandon Mitchell formed The Show in 2007 while on tour in New York City. The original lineup consisted of Saint-Lethal (lead vocals, guitar), Mitchell (guitar, backing vocals), Jeffery "Jeff Bets" Betten (bass guitar), and Joshua Kranitz (drums).

The Show performed its first concert at the Rex Theater in Pittsburgh, PA with Pittsburgh natives Johnny & the Razorblades. The band then toured small venues in the Northeast, while recording their debut album at Treelady Studios.

In 2009, The Show was selected as a Musician's Atlas Spotlight Artist, and they received moderate Internet Radio rotation with "Flying Pig".  They also released their debut LP, Here's to Your Jigsaw. "To Save My Soul" received college and indie airplay across the country, while "Black & Blue" and "I Don't Mind" received light commercial rotation.

Early in 2010, the band learned that "I Don't Mind" and "To Save My Soul" had been picked up in heavy rotation on several stations in Western Europe, especially in the U.K. Both singles charted in the Top 100 in Europe: "I Don't Mind" (EUR Indie #92), and "To Save My Soul" (EUR Indie #97).  Based on this, The Show did a three-week/fifteen-date tour in the U.K. and Ireland in April 2010, selling out venues in Liverpool, Manchester, London and Dublin. The Show then landed support spots on several one-offs and tours for School of Seven Bells, The Red Jumpsuit Apparatus, C.J. Ramone of the Ramones, and Miniature Tigers. The band did a proper U.S. tour in 2011, before returning to Pittsburgh to headline the Rock United Charity Festival.

After supporting Filter on several dates in 2012, the band learned that lead vocalist Johnny Saint-Lethal had been diagnosed with leukoplakia and tumors on his vocal cords. They were forced to cancel their remaining performance dates.

In early 2013, The Show announced that Saint-Lethal had made a full recovery, and the band opened for Soul Asylum in Pittsburgh as their first show back. After a lineup change, they supported Murals, before returning to Pittsburgh for their sold out Fifth Anniversary Concert at the Rex Theater. The Show then began working on a limited edition EP, as well as additional material, with Matthew Vaughan at 20 Cedar Studios.  Their single "Don't Ask Don't Tell" was also used by the Matthew Shepard Foundation to raise money for charity.

...until you know what it's like to stand where there is no ground., the new EP from The Show was released on vinyl and digitally on April 29, 2014. The album charted on the CMJ Charts, and was Top 5 in many U.S. markets. The Show played several festivals throughout the year, and co-headlined at the 45th Anniversary of Woodstock in August. They continued on to play at Music Week in Austin 2015, a Southern U.S. Spring 2015 Tour, and the NXNE Official Showcase in Toronto.

The Show finished recording their next two full-length albums in Pittsburgh in 2015, titled Mantra and Threadbare. Mantra is set to be released in 2016, and Threadbare in 2017.

On July 5, 2016, in the early morning hours following the Fourth of July holiday, former bassist Nicholas Meziere, died after being consecutively struck by two vehicles while bending down to pick up litter. This was confirmed by the band's official Facebook Page, as well as Meziere's immediate family.

On November 19, 2016, Saint-Lethal released a 200+ page book titled "TWENTYSOMETHING". The book is a collection of poetry, prose, and essays, and includes a lengthy account of his time in THE SHOW.

On December 1, 2016, their debut album "Here's To Your Jigsaw" independently sold its 25,000th copy according to the band's official verified Facebook Page.

Johnny Saint Lethal is the subject of a 2017 song by Mark Kozelek, titled "Twenty Something".  The tune appears on the Sun Kil Moon / Jesu collaborative album "30 Seconds To The Decline of Planet Earth", released May 5, 2017.

Current 
The Show's current lineup consists of Johnny Saint-Lethal (lead vocals, guitar) and Brandon Mitchell (guitar, backing vocals). Earlier in 2016, Touchtunes accepted "Don't Ask Don't Tell" into their network and titled The Show one of their Breakout Bands for consideration.

Releasing two new singles, "Sunglasses", and "I Would", to College and Independent Radio, as well as YouTube only, the band is raising awareness for local Pittsburgh non-profit, Creative.Life.Support. Each video had over 8,000 views in its first month of release with no promotion.

The band toured and showcased across the U.S. West Coast in June 2016, and continued on to the U.S. East Coast in October 2016, based on their Official Website, and performed Breast Cancer Fundraising Concerts in Philadelphia, New York City, Brooklyn, Asbury Park, Washington DC, Buffalo, and Boston.

Saint-Lethal, now going by his birth name, and Mitchell, re-ignited their multi-media band, THE QUIET LOUD, in spring of 2016. While never officially stating themselves that The Show was disbanded, the pair have only granted interviews, released music, and performed concerts as The Quiet Loud.

Their first show as The Quiet Loud was in Pittsburgh, PA on August 10 of 2019 at THE GOVERNMENT CENTER. In May 2020, the new project released a cover version of The Five Stairsteps' "O-o-h Child" as a COVID19 fundraiser for small venues in their hometown of Pittsburgh. When asked on radio in June 2020 when the station could expect original material to be released, Ainsworth replied, "We sat on a dock and had not one clue what this was going to sound like, but we were so excited. We had a verse and a guitar riff, but I knew we had magic. Bran said 'I don't care if it takes five years, it has to be right!' I agreed. Didn't think it would take five years though... but it's going to..." "Good news is... we're almost there!"

According to Mitchell, the band have written over forty new songs and have been recording demonstration recordings for an unnamed label. Taken from an Instagram post on the new band's official account, Ainsworth states the band spent all of 2016 and 2017 and part of 2018 writing, and the rest of 2018, 2019, and 2020 doing various sets of demonstration recordings, none of which they were happy with. "We agree that unless we'd feel proud seeing our album on a shelf next to Dark Side of the Moon, it's not coming out. It doesn't have to sell as many copies, or be as commercially massive, but WE have to earnestly believe it's every bit as good... that it punches through the ceiling of social and rat-race culture in the 2020s as Dark Side did in the seventies."

The band often jokes on their official Facebook page about how long it's taking them to record. No release dates have been set for their debut album, although Charlie Goodwin, a friend of the band, said on Twitter in April 2020: "The Quiet Loud first album? You won't believe me if I told you... but I've seen this vision in their heads start to take form, and it's frighteningly good! It'll come out when the time is right. The title is even massive. I can't even say it. But, 2021 seems likely."

Via their official website, The Quiet Loud announced they were self-releasing their first EP in 2023. No track listing has been announced yet. The band are also working with Onyx Rose Management to shop their full length LP during Autumn 2023, of which they are currently recording "proper" demos. On December 2, 2021 the band announced on their social media that bassist Chris Volpini was fighting cancer, but the prognosis was good.  In February 2022, it was announced that Chris Volpini made a full recovery.

Band members

Former members 

 Jeffery "Jeff Bets" Betten – bass guitar (2007–2009, 2011)
 Joshua Kranitz – percussion (2007–2012)
 Andrew Abboushi – bass guitar, keys (2009)
 Christian Junker – bass guitar (2009–2010)
 Kris Corona – bass guitar (2009–2011)
 Jordan McLaughlin – bass guitar (2009, 2011)
 Kyle Dippold – percussion (2010–2011)
 Mason Callender – bass guitar (2011)
 Nicholas Meziere – bass guitar (2011–2012)
 Geoff Tomes – percussion (2011–2012)
 Terry Brown – bass guitar (2012)
 Michael Ward – bass guitar (2012–2014)
 Matthew Vaughan – percussion (2012–2014)
 Wills Butler – percussion (2014)
 Zach Seeber – bass guitar (2014)
 Jakey Stretch – drums (2014-2016)
 Jake Reiger – bass guitar (2014-2016)

Discography

Studio albums 

 Here's to Your Jigsaw, Activate Records (2009)

EPs 

 ...Until You Know What It's Like To Stand Where There Is No Ground. (2014)
 Sunglasses / I Would  (Single, YouTube and Radio Only)  (2016)

Future albums (Currently in label negotiations)  

 (As-of-Now-Untitled EP, 6 songs, (Scheduled for early-2017, Vinyl, DL, and CD)
 Mantra, not yet released (scheduled for mid-2017)
 Threadbare, not yet released (scheduled for early-2018)

Charted songs

Charted albums

References

External links 
 The Official The Show Website
 Pittsburgh Post-Gazette Interview, 2014
 Pittsburgh City Paper Interview, 2014

Musical groups from Pittsburgh
Musical groups established in 2007